Alan Mitchell Edward George Patrick Henry Gallagher (October 19, 1945 – December 6, 2018) was an American professional baseball player who played four seasons for the San Francisco Giants and California Angels of Major League Baseball. He played in 442 games during his career in which he had 1,264 at bats, 333 hits, 114 runs, 11 home runs, 130 RBIs, 42 doubles, 9 triples, and 7 stolen bases. He also had 164 strikeouts and was walked 138 times.

Biography 
In 1977, Gallagher managed the Texas City Stars of the Lone Star League, capturing the second half title. From 1995 to 1997 "Dirty Al" was the manager of the Bend Bandits (Bend, Oregon) of the Western Baseball League. From 1998-2000 he managed the Madison Blackwolf (Madison, WI) of the Northern League. In 2001 he was a bench coach for the Albany-Colonie Diamond Dogs (Albany, NY).In 2002, Al managed the Duluth–Superior Dukes of the Independent Northern League and stayed with the organization following its move to Kansas City following the 2002 season.  From 2003 to 2006 he managed the Kansas City T-Bones in Kansas City, Kansas of the Northern League. On October 16, 2006, Al was fired by the T-Bones but quickly found work with the St. Joseph Blacksnakes of the American Association. He managed the Blacksnakes through the 2007 season, when the team disbanded.

Gallagher died on December 6, 2018 in Fresno, California.

References

External links

1945 births
2018 deaths
Amarillo Giants players
Baseball players from San Francisco
Buffalo Bisons (minor league) managers
California Angels players
Chattanooga Lookouts managers
Durham Bulls managers
Durham Bulls players
Fresno Giants players
Major League Baseball third basemen
Northern League (baseball, 1993–2010) managers
Phoenix Giants players
Richmond Braves players
Salt Lake City Angels players
San Francisco Giants players
Seattle Mariners scouts
Springfield Giants players
Tacoma Cubs players
Tacoma Giants players